The 1955 European Rowing Championships for men were rowing championships held in the Belgian city of Ghent. The venue was the Watersportbaan, which was built for these championships and was part of Belgium's preparation for their bid to host the 1960 Summer Olympics. The competition for women had been held earlier in the month in Bucharest. The event in Ghent was held from 25 to 28 August and they competed in all seven Olympic boat classes (M1x, M2x, M2-, M2+, M4-, M4+, M8+). Some 400 competitors from 21 countries competed.

German participation
The National Olympic Committee of the GDR was granted provisional membership in 1955 and as a next step, East Germany tried to gain membership of the individual sporting organisations that participated in Olympic disciplines. In July 1955, the East German rowing association applied for a license from FISA, the International Rowing Federation, to be able to nominate their rowers at the European Championships in Bucharest (women) and Ghent (men). FISA's response was that the next congress, to be held just prior to the championships in Ghent, will decide on the matter. Therefore, East German teams could not compete in 1955. At the congress, East Germany was unanimously accepted as a new member.

West Germany was represented in Ghent in six boat classes.

Romania
A Romanian crew won gold with the coxless four. This was the country's first gold medal in international rowing.

Medal summary – men's events

References

European Rowing Championships
European Rowing Championships
Rowing
Rowing
Rowing competitions in Belgium